The Château de Vieillecour is a château in Saint-Pierre-de-Frugie, Dordogne, Nouvelle-Aquitaine, France. It was declared a monument historique in 1946.

Châteaux in Dordogne
Monuments historiques of Dordogne